Raimundo Alves (born 31 August 1950) is a Brazilian boxer. He competed in the men's featherweight event at the 1976 Summer Olympics. At the 1976 Summer Olympics, he lost to Juan Paredes of Mexico.

References

External links
 

1950 births
Living people
Brazilian male boxers
Olympic boxers of Brazil
Boxers at the 1976 Summer Olympics
Featherweight boxers